Shahrdari Tabriz Cultural and Athletic Club (Persian: باشگاه فرهنگی ورزشی شهرداري تبريز) is an Iranian sports club most widely known for its professional futsal team based in Tabriz, Iran.They currently compete in the Iranian Futsal Super League, the 1st tier of Iranian futsal.

Season-by-season 
The table below chronicles the achievements of the Club in various competitions.

Honours 
 Iran Futsal's 1st Division
 Champions (1): 2011-12

First-team squad 2012-13

See also 
 Shahrdari Tabriz Football Club

External links 
Shahrdari Tabriz's Stats and History in PersianLeague
 Official Website (Persian)

References 

Futsal clubs in Iran
Sport in Tabriz